Warm & Scratchy is a free download album released in 2007 by Adult Swim (through Williams Street Records).

Track listing
TV On The Radio – "Me-I" (3:16)	
The Raveonettes – "Dead Sound" (2:57)	
Les Savy Fav –	"The Equestrian" (3:27)	
The Rapture – "Crimson Red" (3:47)
120 Days – "Justine" (2:21)	
Broken Social Scene – "Canada vs. America" (6:09)	
Sound Team – "Color Of The Love You Have" (4:03)	
The Good, the Bad & the Queen – "The Bunting Song (Acoustic Version)" (4:02)	
The Brother Kite – "Half Century" (4:04)	
Jesu – "Silver (Original Beats)" (7:01)	
Amusement Parks On Fire – "Back To Flash" (4:21)	
Asobi Seksu – "Stay Awake" (5:32)	
Fennesz – "Winter" (4:38)
Liars – "Sunset Rodeo" (4:12)

References

Albums free for download by copyright owner
Williams Street Records compilation albums